{|

{{Infobox ship characteristics
|Hide header=
|Header caption=
|Ship class=Type D2 submarine
|Ship displacement=* surfaced
 submerged
|Ship length= overall
|Ship beam= 
|Ship draft=
|Ship propulsion=*2 × Kampon Mk.23B Model 8 diesels
1,750 bhp surfaced
1,200 shp submerged
2 shafts
|Ship speed=* surfaced
 submerged
|Ship range=* at  surfaced
 at  submerged
|Ship endurance=
|Ship test depth=
|Ship capacity=*110 tons freight (as built)
200 tons gasoline June 1945|Ship boats=
|Ship complement=55
|Ship sensors=
|Ship EW=
|Ship armament=
2 ×  Type 3 mortars
7 × Type 96 25mm AA guns
|Ship aircraft=
|Ship aircraft facilities=
|Ship notes=
}}
|}I-373 was an Imperial Japanese Navy Type D2 transport submarine. The only Type D2 submarine to be completed, she was commissioned in April 1945, and converted into a tanker submarine. In August 1945 became the last Japanese submarine sunk during World War II.

Construction and commissioning

I-373 was laid down on 13 August 1944 by Yokosuka Navy Yard at Yokosuka, Japan, with the name Submarine No. 2962. On 5 October 1944, she was renamed I-373' and was provisionally attached to the Yokosuka Naval District. She was launched on 30 November 1944 and was completed and commissioned on 14 April 1945.

Service history

Upon commissioning, I-373 was attached formally to the Yokosuka Naval District and was assigned to Submarine Squadron 11 for workups. On 16 June 1945, she departed Yokosuka bound for Sasebo. Arriving at Sasebo on 17 June 1945, she began conversion into a tanker submarine capable of carrying 150 metric tons of aviation gasoline in addition to other cargo. On 20 June 1945, she was reassigned to Submarine Division 15 in the 6th Fleet.

Transport operations
Fleet Radio Unit, Melbourne (FRUMEL), an Allied signals intelligence unit headquartered at Melbourne, Australia, reported that it had intercepted and decrypted signals that indicated that I-373 departed Sasebo on a supply run to Takao on Formosa on 3 July 1945 and returned to Sasebo on 26 July 1945, but post-World War II examination of Japanese records has not corroborated FRUMEL's reporting.

On 5 August 1945, FRUMEL reported that it had intercepted and decrypted a Japanese signal indicating that I-373 would depart Sasebo that day bound for Takao and would return with a cargo of aviation gasoline, rice, and sugar. In fact, I-373 got underway from Sasebo on 9 August 1945 headed for Takao.

Loss

Spikefish′s radar detector also detected the pulse of  Type 13 air-search radar.

Spikefish′s sound operator reported hearing loud sounds of air escaping from the sinking I-373.Spikefish surfaced, and at 05:40 she passed through a thick slick of diesel fuel and a large amount of floating debris. She found five survivors in the water, all of whom refused rescue. She left four of them to perish in the water but forcibly brought one of them aboard.

Eighty-four men died in the sinking of I-373'', the last Japanese submarine lost in World War II, which ended the next day. The Japanese removed her from the Navy list on 15 September 1945.

Notes

Sources
 Hackett, Bob & Kingsepp, Sander.  IJN Submarine I-373: Tabular Record of Movement.  Retrieved on September 19, 2020.

Type D submarines
Ships built by Yokosuka Naval Arsenal
1944 ships
World War II submarines of Japan
Japanese submarines lost during World War II
Maritime incidents in August 1945
World War II shipwrecks in the East China Sea
Submarines sunk by submarines
Ships sunk by American submarines